The following is a list of print, television, and radio media serving the Las Vegas Valley.  As of 2017, Las Vegas is ranked as the fortieth-largest television market in the United States, with 757,400 homes in Southern Nevada and parts of northwestern Arizona, according to Nielsen Media Research.

Print
Las Vegas CityLife
Las Vegas Review-Journal
Las Vegas Sun
Las Vegas Weekly

Television
The following is a list of full-power stations serving the Las Vegas Valley; for full listings, please see the Las Vegas TV template.

Radio

AM

FM

References

Las Vegas
Culture of Las Vegas